Bang! You're Dead is a 1954 British psychological drama film directed by Lance Comfort and starring Jack Warner, Anthony Richmond, Veronica Hurst, Derek Farr and Sean Barrett.  The film takes as its subject the accidental killing of a man by a child, and the struggles of the child and his companion to comprehend the gravity of what has happened. The film was shot at Shepperton Studios with sets designed by the art director Norman G. Arnold. It was distributed by British Lion Films.

Plot
Seven year old Cliff Bonsell (Richmond) lives a lonely life with his very elderly and widowed father (Warner) in a hut on a decommissioned American army munitions stores depot in rural England.

Cliff has few friends, his main companion being the slightly older Willy Maxted (Barrett), a quiet and introverted child who lives nearby with his grandmother (Beatrice Varley). Cliff has developed a fascination for guns from films he has seen, regarding them as fun toys with which to play imaginative games. Willy's main interest is his gramophone and a single recording : "Lazy Day".

Cliff discovers an old army service revolver left behind at the depot and is thrilled to have found a realistic toy to play with.  He and Willy are out together when they come across unpopular local Ben Jones (Philip Saville).  Cliff decides to tease him by threatening him with the gun cowboy-style.  When Jones refuses to play along, Cliff pulls the trigger, not realising that the gun is still loaded with live bullets.  Jones collapses and the pair at first think he is play-acting, but soon realise that he is dead.  They flee the scene in panic.

Jones's body is discovered shortly afterwards by Bob Carter (Michael Medwin), who alerts the local police. Carter also finds the gun and pockets it. However, when investigating detective Gray (Derek Farr) learns that Carter and Jones had recently been involved in a fight over the attentions of the flirtatious Hilda (Veronica Hurst), Carter becomes the main suspect and is taken in for questioning.  Cliff and Willy become increasingly tormented as they try to weigh up whether it is better to let an innocent man be punished, or to confess to what actually happened and face what they see as the fearful consequences.  Meanwhile, Grey gradually comes to realise that the case may not be as clear-cut as it first appeared.

Cast
 Jack Warner as Bonsell
 Anthony Richmond as Cliff Bonsell
 Sean Barrett as Willy Maxted
 Derek Farr as Detective Gray
 Veronica Hurst as Hilda
 Michael Medwin as Bob Carter
 Gordon Harker as Mr. Hare
 Beatrice Varley as Mrs. Maxted
 Philip Saville as Ben Jones
 John Warwick as Sgt. Gurney
 Toke Townley as Jimmy Knuckle

Locations
The public house "Who’d A Thought It" was in Nine Mile Ride, Crowthorne. It was closed and demolished in 2003.

Reception
The Time Out Film Guide describes it as "a strange little film (which) can't make up its mind whether it's a thriller or a piece of social conscience, but the performance of the boy lends it charm."

References

External links 
 
 
 
 

1954 films
1950s psychological drama films
Films directed by Lance Comfort
British black-and-white films
British psychological drama films
Films set in England
1954 drama films
Films scored by Eric Spear
British Lion Films films
Films shot at Shepperton Studios
1950s English-language films
1950s British films